You Bring Me Joy may refer to:

 "You Bring Me Joy" (Anita Baker song), 1980
 "You Bring Me Joy" (Mary J. Blige song), 1994
 "You Bring Me Joy" (Amelia Lily song), 2012